Lugari Constituency is an electoral constituency in Kenya. It is one of twelve constituencies in Kakamega County, and the only constituency in the former Lugari District. The entire constituency has eight wards, all of which elect councillors for the Lugari County Council. The constituency was established for the 1988 elections.

Members of Parliament

Locations and wards

References

External links 
Map of the constituency

Constituencies in Kakamega County
Constituencies of Western Province (Kenya)
1988 establishments in Kenya
Constituencies established in 1988